William Biggs (1804 – 3 October 1881) was a British politician and hosier. He was elected as a councillor for Leicester City Council on 26 December 1835 where he served as Mayor on three occasions in 1842, 1848 and 1859. In 1852 he was elected to Parliament as the member for Newport. He resigned from Parliament on 7 January 1857 through appointment as Steward of the Chiltern Hundreds.

He was President of the Leicester Literary and Philosophical Society in 1849.

Born in Leicester in 1804, he was the younger brother of John Biggs who was also a politician and hosier. He died in Liverpool on 3 October 1881 at the age of 77.

References

External links

Whig (British political party) MPs for English constituencies
Members of Parliament for Newport (Isle of Wight)
1804 births
1881 deaths
UK MPs 1852–1857
Councillors in Leicestershire
Mayors of places in Leicestershire